Elwill M. Shanahan (September 22, 1912 – October 5, 1983) was an American politician who served as the Secretary of State of Kansas from 1966 to 1978.

She died of cancer on October 5, 1983, in Topeka, Kansas at age 71.

References

1912 births
1983 deaths
Secretaries of State of Kansas
Kansas Republicans
Women state constitutional officers of Kansas